Gosford High School (abbreviated as GHS) is a government-funded co-educational academically selective secondary day school, located in Gosford, in the Central Coast region of New South Wales, Australia.

Established in 1928, the school enrolled approximately 1,070 students in 2018, from Year 7 to Year 12, of whom two percent identified as Indigenous Australians and forty percent were from a language background other than English. The school is operated by the NSW Department of Education; the principal is Michael Smith.

History
Gosford High School, operated by the New South Wales Department of Education, was established in 1928, the first secondary school in the Central Coast region, and became a selective high school in 1989. The original building was completed in 1929, and consisted of seven classrooms, one science laboratory and an assembly room. Students at the school primarily come from the Central Coast region, though students from the Sydney and Lake Macquarie regions comprise a significant portion of the population. , Gosford High was the only fully selective school on the Central Coast, making admission very competitive.

Motto
The school's Latin motto is spectemur agendo, which is conventionally translated into English as "Judge me by what I do." Other translations include Let us be judged by our acts and By our deeds may we be known (this translation is preferred by Camberwell Grammar School in Melbourne, which shares the same motto).

Staff
The principal of Gosford High School from 2006 to 2016 was Lynne Searle. She was replaced in 2017 by Tony Rudd, the former principal of Manly Selective Campus. Tony Rudd retired at the beginning of the 2019 academic year with previous deputy Adrienne Scalese taking over the position temporarily. The position of principal is taken by former principal of Narara Valley High School Michael Smith as of the start of term 2 of the 2019 academic year.

Notable among the former staff are Dr Mark Butler (now retired), recipient of the Prime Minister's Prize for Excellence in Science Teaching in Secondary Schools in 2004, who has been elected to the National Curriculum Board, and Rebecca Donoghue, Head of Visual Arts, who received the Minister's Award for Excellence in Teaching in 2013 (now retired, replaced by Wendy Mortimer) and Michael Chamberlain, who was falsely convicted with wife Lindy in the death of their daughter Azaria, later exonerated.

Current staff include Brian Jackson, a former rugby league football player.

Extracurricular and co-curricular

Music
Apart from the mandatory Music course in Year 8, the school has several music groups and programmes, including a Concert Band that has toured overseas in Hong Kong, New Zealand and Singapore. A school musical is held every two years. The school also hosts an annual Kerle Comp, in which students form bands to perform the music of Bobby King.

Sport
The school holds annual swimming, athletics and cross country carnivals, with achieving students competing in higher level competitions. Within the school there are four sporting houses: Kingsbury (red and white), Rowe (black and white), Wheeler (green and yellow) and OSU (brown and yellow), named after prominent members of the local community and the Old Students Union.

Gosford and Orange High School have an annual school exchange program which has taken place since 1968. Each year sporting teams are selected from both Orange and Gosford High Schools to compete against each other for the Malynley Shield, the name Malynley being an acronym of Dews' family members who donated the shield.

Agriculture
Gosford High School shares a three-hectare agricultural farm with neighbouring Henry Kendall High School.

Notable alumni
John BrewPublic servant and engineer
Pat Conroy - Minister in the Albanese government
 David Fairleighrugby league player and coach
 Adrian GoldsmithWorld War II (1921-1961) flying ace
 Jack Grahame (1933-2003) lawyer
 Chris Holsteinpolitician
Daria Nina LoveVeterinary microbiologist
 Donald McGillivray (1935-2012) botanical taxonomist
 Alan Ramsey – journalist
June RossGeologist, paleontologist, biologist, and one of the first Australian women to obtain a PhD
Arthur TangeSecretary of DFAT and Department of Defence
Felicity Wardcomedian

See also 

 List of government schools in New South Wales
 List of selective high schools in New South Wales

References

External links
 

Educational institutions established in 1928
Public high schools in New South Wales
Selective schools in New South Wales
1928 establishments in Australia
Central Coast (New South Wales)